"Inappropriate Behaviour" is a song by Australian pop rock duo Lime Cordiale, released on 17 May 2019 as the fourth single from their second studio album 14 Steps to a Better You (2020).

The song was polled at number 13 in Triple J's Hottest 100 of 2019. The song was certified gold in Australia in 2020.

Music video
The video was directed by Aimée-Lee X Curran and Jack Sheppard. The band says: "The music video plays on the 'manipulator' line of the song. We wanted this video to show the whole band in the studio but felt we needed the 'manipulator' in there too. You've often gotta hold on to your vision in the studio, as much as others might try to sway your opinions. We really don't keep it together when this 10-year-old shows up and starts telling us what's what."

Credits and personnel

Song credits
Adapted from the parent album's liner notes.

Musicians
Lime Cordiale
 Oliver Leimbach – vocals, guitar, bass, saxophone, trumpet, flute, clarinet, kazoo
 Louis Leimbach – vocals, guitar, bass, saxophone, trumpet, flute, clarinet, kazoo

Other musicians
 David Karam Haddad – writing
 James Jennings – drums
 Felix Bornholdt – keyboards
 Nicholas Polovineo – trombone, trumpet, flugelhorn
 Karen Leimbach – cello
 Lisa Buchanan – violin

Technical
 Dave Hammer – production, mixing
 Brian Lucey at Magic Gardens Mastering – mastering

Artwork
Adapted from the band's official website.

 Louis Leimbach – cover design

Certifications

Notes

References

2019 singles
2019 songs
Lime Cordiale songs
Songs written by Louis Leimbach
Songs written by Oli Leimbach